William Jack Poulter (born 28 January 1993) is an English actor. He first gained recognition for his role as Eustace Scrubb in the fantasy adventure film The Chronicles of Narnia: The Voyage of the Dawn Treader (2010). He received critical praise for his starring role in the comedy film We're the Millers (2013), for which he won the BAFTA Rising Star Award.

Poulter starred in the dystopian science fiction film The Maze Runner (2014) and the sequel Maze Runner: The Death Cure (2018), the period epic film The Revenant (2015), the crime drama film Detroit (2017), the interactive science fiction film Black Mirror: Bandersnatch (2018), and the folk horror film Midsommar (2019). In 2021, he had a leading role in the Hulu miniseries Dopesick, for which he received an Emmy nomination for Outstanding Supporting Actor in a Limited or Anthology Series or Movie.

Early life
Poulter was born on 28 January 1993 in Hammersmith, London, the son of Neil Poulter, a professor of Preventive Cardiovascular Medicine at Imperial College London, and Caroline (née Barrah), a former nurse who was brought up in Kenya. He was a pupil at Harrodian School, whose well-known acting graduates also include George MacKay and Robert Pattinson. However, he struggled in school due to dyslexia and developmental coordination disorder, telling The Independent in 2013, "It felt like it didn't matter how hard I tried, I wasn't getting anywhere. That's the most demoralising thing, as a kid. And to find something like drama, which I loved so much... it gave me a sense of purpose."

Poulter began studying drama at the University of Bristol in 2012, before dropping out after a year.

Poulter is a supporter of Arsenal F.C.

Career

2007–2012: Early work
Poulter played various acting roles before landing the role of Lee Carter in the 2007 movie Son of Rambow, which was released to positive reviews and praised for the performances of Poulter and his co-star Bill Milner. He also performed with other young comedic actors in School of Comedy, which aired its pilot on Channel 4's Comedy Lab on 21 August 2008. School of Comedy was then commissioned for a full series by Channel 4, which began airing on 2 October 2009. The programme finished after a second series.

In 2009, he was selected to play the role of Eustace Scrubb in the film The Chronicles of Narnia: The Voyage of the Dawn Treader (filmed in Queensland, Australia), and was accompanied by some members of his family. The movie was first screened on 10 December 2010. The film opened to mixed reviews, but Poulter's performance was well received.

In 2010, he appeared in the BBC Three pilot The Fades, a 60-minute supernatural thriller written by Skins writer Jack Thorne. The pilot was picked up as a six-part series with an almost entirely new cast, which aired in 2011.

Poulter began filming a small British independent film called Wild Bill, directed by Dexter Fletcher, at the end of 2010. The film was released on 23 March 2012 to extremely positive reviews, with praise for Poulter's performance. In 2011, Poulter appeared with his School of Comedy co-star and popular British blogger, Jack Harries, on his YouTube channel JacksGap, in a video called Jack and Will. In 2012, Poulter began studying drama at the University of Bristol where he lived in Badock Hall, however dropped out after a year in order to pursue acting full time.

2013–present: Mainstream recognition and further work

In 2013, he played Kenny in We're the Millers, starring Jennifer Aniston and Jason Sudeikis. While the film opened to mixed reviews, the performances of the cast were well received, especially that of Poulter, who found mainstream recognition with his showy, comedic work in the film. He also appeared as a caretaker in the music video for Rizzle Kicks' song "Skip to the Good Bit". Though he loved the script and auditioned for the role of Augustus Waters, he was denied the part in The Fault in Our Stars.

In 2014, he played Fordy in the crime film Plastic, directed by Julian Gilbey and starring Ed Speleers, Alfie Allen, Sebastian De Souza and Emma Rigby. The film was critically panned on release. The same year, he played Gally in the film adaptation of The Maze Runner, alongside Dylan O'Brien and Kaya Scodelario. The film was a critical and commercial success, with the performances of the cast being praised. Poulter went on to describe the film, and his role in it, as "a turning point" in his career.

In 2015, Poulter starred as Shane in the Irish indie film Glassland, directed by Gerard Barrett and co-starring Jack Reynor and Toni Collette.

In 2014, Poulter won the BAFTA Rising Star Award, voted for by the public. The same year, he also won the MTV Movie Award for Best Breakthrough Performance and the MTV Movie Award for Best Kiss (shared with his co-stars Jennifer Aniston and Emma Roberts) for his performance in We're the Millers.

In 2014, Poulter was chosen as one of 23 upcoming actors to feature in July's issue of Vanity Fair, with all actors being named "Hollywood's Next Wave".

Poulter played Jim Bridger in the revenge-thriller The Revenant (2015), directed by Alejandro González Iñárritu, and starring Leonardo DiCaprio and Tom Hardy. The film centres on an 1820s frontiersman on a path of vengeance against those who left him for dead after a bear mauling. In 2017, he played the racist police officer Philip Krauss in the film Detroit, about the 1967 Detroit riots. His work in the film was praised with one critic calling him "terrifyingly confident".

Poulter was initially cast as Pennywise the Dancing Clown in the 2017 adaptation of the Stephen King novel It. However, it was announced in June 2016 that Bill Skarsgård had been cast instead because Poulter dropped out due both to scheduling conflicts (the film was set to shoot at the same time as Poulter was set to begin work on Detroit) as well as the departure of its initial director, Cary Fukunaga.

In 2018, Poulter reprised his role as Gally in Maze Runner: The Death Cure, the third and final installment of the Maze Runner film series. Later that year, he starred in the film The Little Stranger as Roderick "Roddy" Ayres, a facially disfigured, haunted war veteran; and as game developer Colin Ritman in Black Mirror: Bandersnatch, a standalone interactive film of the Black Mirror television series. In 2019, he played the character of Mark in Ari Aster's horror film Midsommar. In 2020, he participated in filming The Dark Pictures Anthology: Little Hope, an interactive choice game created by Supermassive Games, in which he portrays Andrew, Anthony and Abraham.

In October 2021, Poulter was cast in Guardians of the Galaxy Vol. 3 as Adam Warlock, set to be released on 5 May 2023.

Poulter played the role of OxyContin sales representative Billy Cutler in Hulu's 2021 drama miniseries Dopesick. Poulter's performance was nominated for a 2022 Primetime Emmy Award for Outstanding Supporting Actor in a Limited or Anthology Series or Movie for this role.

Filmography

Film

Television

Video games

Awards and nominations

References

External links

1993 births
Living people
21st-century English male actors
BAFTA Rising Star Award winners
BAFTA winners (people)
English male child actors
English male film actors
English male stage actors
English male television actors
Male actors from London
People educated at The Harrodian School
People from Hammersmith
Actors with dyslexia